"Sky Is Over" is a song by Serj Tankian. The song was released as the second single from Tankian's debut solo album Elect the Dead. The song charted on both the Modern Rock Tracks and the Mainstream Rock Tracks in the US.

Track listing
All songs written by Tankian.

Radio edit promo single

2 Track promo

Official UK CD single

Digital download single

Song meaning
This song is worked around the website  which Tankian supports. This means that the song is about pollution and global warming. Tankian said also, about the meaning of the song, in an interview with Roadrunner Records:

Music video
Elect the Dead was accompanied by a complete set of videos for each track, September 11, 2007. Tankian was not pleased by the original video and so he and director Tony Petrossian made an official video for "Sky Is Over", released on January 16, 2008.

The music video begins with Tankian playing a white piano in the middle of the street. After establishing the main piano melody, he gets up, walks down the street, and picks up a chalkboard eraser. With the eraser he begins literally "erasing" the sky out with erratic swipes over the wordless chorus, then throws the eraser far away and walks to a black piano to play the last note. The camera pans up to reveal that amid the random eraser swipes he has written . The entire video was shot in one take. At the end of the video a web address is shown for the now defunct "Sky Is Over" website, which gave links to various environmental organizations.

Chart positions

References

External links
Serj Tankian's website

2008 singles
Serj Tankian songs
Music videos directed by Tony Petrossian
2007 songs
Songs written by Serj Tankian
Reprise Records singles